Texas Star Flyer is a Funtime Star Flyer operating at Galveston Island Historic Pleasure Pier. The ride opened to the public on July 27, 2012. The ride was installed by Ride Entertainment Group, who handles all of Funtime's operations in North America.

Ride
First pieces of Texas Star Flyer arrived at the pier in the middle of January 2012.

Texas Star Flyer is similar to SkyScreamer that is found at several other Six Flags parks including Six Flags Fiesta Texas found in the same state of Texas. Once opened Texas Star Flyer was the tallest swing ride in Texas, until the Texas SkyScreamer opened at Six Flags Over Texas in May 2013.

See also
 2012 in amusement parks
 SkyScreamer, a series of Funtime Star Flyer Tower Swingers at Six Flags theme parks

References

Amusement rides manufactured by Funtime
Amusement rides introduced in 2012
Swing rides
Galveston Island Historic Pleasure Pier
Towers in Texas
2012 establishments in Texas
Towers completed in 2012